Smile is the eleventh studio album by Japanese singer and songwriter Mai Kuraki. The album was released on February 15, 2017, by Northern Music. It is the follow-up to her 2014 compilation album, Mai Kuraki Best 151A: Love & Hope. The album was released on three editions: standard edition, fan club edition, and limited edition, which is accompanied with a bonus disc. Smile

The album was preceded by three singles, "Serendipity", "Sawage Life", and "Yesterday Love", which was released as the video single and peaked at number six in Japan. To promote the album, Kuraki embarked on the national tour, "Mai Kuraki Live Project 2017 "Sawage Life"" from March 18, 2017.

Promotion

Singles
"Serendipity" was released as the lead single from the album on May 20, 2015. It has peaked at number 6 on the RecoChoku Weekly Singles Chart, but failed to enter the Japan Hot 100. The song was used by West Japan Railway Company for the promotion of San'yō Shinkansen.

"Sawage Life" was released as the second single from the album on July 30, 2016. The song was written by the American singer-songwriter Porcelain Black and Bobby Huff and featured as the ending theme song for the Japanese animation program Case Closed.

"Yesterday Love" was released as the third single from the album on January 11, 2017. The song was released on Blu-ray and DVD format and has peaked at number 3 on the Oricon Music Blu-ray Chart. The song was also featured as the ending theme song for Case Closed.

Commercial performance
Smile sold 11,910 copies in its release date and debuted at number 4 on the Oricon daily chart behind Big Bang's Made, Scandal's Best Album "Scandal" and Leo Ieiri's 5th Anniversary Best.
It peaked at number 2 on the chart on February 16, 2017 with selling 4,220 copies in a day. The album debuted at number 4 on the Oricon weekly chart with selling 21,222 copies in its first week.

As of March, 2018, the album has sold 29,716 physical copies in Japan.

Track listing

Personnel
Credits adapted from the CD booklet of Smile.

Mai Kuraki – vocals, producer, songwriting,
Akihito Tokunaga - composing, tracking
Toshiya Kubota - composing, backing vocals
Daikō Nagato - producer, composing, tracking
Shibu - composing, tracking
Command Freaks- composing, tracking
Tesung Kim - composing, tracking
Sophia Pae - composing, tracking
Jake K - composing, tracking
Takashi Fukuda - composing, tracking
Maxx song - composing, tracking
Yongshin Kim - composing, tracking
Alaina Beaton - composing
Bobby Huff - composing
Makoto Watanabe - composing
Manabu Marutani - composing
Nanna Larsen - composing

Sidnie Tipton - composing
Shane Pittman - composing
Michael Africk - backing vocals
Taito - tracking
Shoko Mochiyama - tracking
Nash Overstreet - tracking
Naoki Morioka - guitar
Yumemoto Tsuresawa - guitar, tracking
Takayuki Ichikawa - recording, mixing
Seiji Motoyama - mixing, composing, tracking
Ethan Brand - mixing
Miguel Sa Pessoa - mixing
Asumi Narita - coordinator
Masahiro Shimada- mastering
Miho Saito - A&R
Asako Watanabe - artist management
Chiharu Kurosawa - artist management
Tetsuo Sato - art direction, art design

Charts

Daily charts

Weekly charts

Monthly charts

Certification and sales

Release history

References

2017 albums
Mai Kuraki albums
Being Inc. albums
Japanese-language albums
Albums produced by Daiko Nagato